Samick Musical Instruments Co., Ltd. (Hangul: 삼익악기, also known as Samick) is a South Korean musical instrument manufacturer. Founded in 1958 as Samick Pianos, it is now one of the world's largest musical instrument manufacturers and an owner of shares in several musical instrument manufacturing companies.

Apart from its own brand, Samick manufactures musical instruments through its subsidiary brands such as Wm. Knabe & Co., Pramberger, Kohler & Campbell, and Seiler (pianos), Greg Bennett, Silvertone, Stony River, and San Mateo (guitars).

Operations

In 1992, Samick built its P.T. Samick factory in Cileungsi, near Bogor, Indonesia. This factory produces the majority of instruments that Samick makes.

North American operations are performed from its newly constructed (completed July 2007) North American Corporate Headquarters, located in Gallatin, TN. This  facility is responsible for all administrative activities for the North American market, as well as acting as a distribution center for its guitars and acoustic/digital pianos. The facility recently began the manufacture of a small number of acoustic pianos, which will be sold under the Knabe brand.

Guitar manufacturing and OEM supply

Samick guitars are manufactured under different brand names and made by a number of different makers, including Greg Bennett and J.T. Riboloff (a former luthier at Gibson). Some other Samick-built guitars are sold under Squier, Epiphone, Washburn, Hohner, Silvertone, and other brands.

Greg Bennett Guitars 
American luthier Greg Bennett designed a line of guitars for Samick. The guitars have pickups designed by Seymour Duncan, machine heads from Grover, and bridges by Wilkinson. Woods used include ovangkol and ebony from Africa, rosewood from India, and rock maple from North America. Instruments under the Greg Bennett label are electric, acoustic and archtop guitars, electric and acoustic basses, mandolins, banjos, ukuleles and autoharps.

Bennett died on June 29, 2020 at the age of 69.

Piano manufacturing and brand management
Samick also has a wide range of pianos. Its acoustic piano brands include Samick, Pramberger, Wm. Knabe & Co., Kohler & Campbell, and Gebrüder Schulze; and it has digital piano brands of Kohler, Samick Digital, and Symphonia. Samick recently announced the discontinuation of the Sohmer & Co. brand.

In 2004, Samick gained controlling interest in competitor Young Chang, but antitrust rulings in the U.S. and Korea ended the merger a year later. From 2003 to 2009 Samick was associated with German C. Bechstein Pianofortefabrik.

In addition, Bechstein and Samick have a joint venture factory in Shanghai, China.  In October 2008, Samick announced its purchase of Seiler, another German piano company, that is generally agreed to compete with Bechstein at both price point and overall quality.  The announcement raises questions about the continued viability of relationship between Samick and Bechstein .

In late 2009, Samick acquired a 16.5% share of Steinway Musical Instruments. By November 2010, Samick's share in Steinway Musical Instruments increased to 32%. In 2013, John Paulson outbid Samick when Steinway and Sons was taken private.

Other businesses 
In 1975, Samick Pianos, as the company was known at that time, created an archery department and began building bows. In 1990, this division was spun off as Samick Sports Co., Ltd. In 2016, the company was restructured and its name changed to Samick Archery Co., Ltd. Since 1996, its products have been used to attain several Olympic gold medals, mostly by Korean athletes. Besides Olympic-level archery equipment, Samick also manufactures the very popular budget-oriented Sage and Polaris hunting bows.

References

External links
 Official website

Piano manufacturing companies
Guitar manufacturing companies
Musical instrument manufacturing companies of South Korea
Manufacturing companies established in 1958
South Korean companies established in 1958